Milutin Mrkonjić (23 May 1942 – 27 November 2021) was a Serbian politician. He co-founded the Socialist Party of Serbia together with Slobodan Milošević.

Education and career
Mrkonjić was born in 1942 in Belgrade, then occupied by Nazi Germany. His father was a Croatian Serb from the village of Bojna, near Glina, in the region of Banija.

Mrkonjić graduated from the  University of Belgrade Faculty of Civil Engineering in 1968. He was the first director of CIP - Institute of Transportation.

He was the head of the Reconstruction Agency after NATO bombing of FR Yugoslavia in 1999.

He ran for president in the 2008 election under slogans "Achievements speak for themselves" (Serbian: Дела говоре, Dela govore) and "Our Comrade!" (Наш друг! Naš drug!). Mrkonjić finished fourth with 5.97%.

On 8 May 2007, Mrkonjić became vice-president of the National Assembly of Serbia, and on 7 July 2008 he became Minister for Infrastructure in the Serbian government. He became the Minister for Infrastructure and Energy in March 2011.

References

External links

1942 births
2021 deaths
Politicians from Belgrade
Government ministers of Serbia
Socialist Party of Serbia politicians
University of Belgrade Faculty of Civil Engineering alumni
Candidates for President of Serbia
Serbian people of Croatian descent